Akademi Sepak Bola Intinusa Olah Prima Football Club (simply known as ASIOP FC) is a Indonesian football club based in South Jakarta, Jakarta. The club currently competes in Liga 3.

Established in 1997, ASIOP is a club that started as a football academy club, and until now has become one of the best football academies in Indonesia, ASIOP has won several achievements in local, national and international championships.

History
Initially, ASIOP was a soccer school that was founded on 28 September 1997, with the goal of channeling a hobby or talent in football at a young age. ASIOP Football Academy has experienced and licensed coaching instructors with AFC B and/or C-License. And also assisted by licensed trainers.

Until now, ASIOP continues to produce professional and national team players. Currently, there are several players produced by ASIOP, some of whom have careers in Indonesian professional league competitions and are also part of the national team, or have at any point played overseas. Some examples are: Andritany Ardhiyasa, Egi Melgiansyah, Adixi Lenzivio, Airlangga Sutjipto, Syamsir Alam, Taji Prasetio, Dibyo Prasetio, Fahreza Agamal, Achmad Jufriyanto, Zahra Muzdalifah, Khairul Imam Zakiri and Rendy Juliansyah.

Affiliated clubs 
  Brooklyn United

Brooklyn United
ASIOP cooperates with a club from the United States, Brooklyn United. The two academies are building an international strategic partnership for the development of youth football.

Going forward, Brooklyn United and ASIOP will send players and coaches to each other, to help ASIOP players and coaches develop further. ASIOP and Brooklyn United will also send each other academy teams to every tournament held in New York as well as international tournaments hosted by ASIOP. In addition they will share their knowledge and experience in running academy management across all age categories as well as managing commercial sponsorships.

Sponsorship
The official team sponsors are as follows:

Sponsors
 Mills Sport
 SriLankan Airlines
 Sompo Insurance Indonesia
 AQUA
 Transtama Logistics
 Ethiopian Airlines
 PT City Trans Utama
 MRA
 PT Arminareka Perdana
 PT Inti Sukses Garmindo
 ''PT Panca Prima Maju Bersama (PPMB)

Honours
 Liga 3 Jakarta
 Runner-up: 2021

References

External links

South Jakarta
Sport in Jakarta
Football clubs in Indonesia
Football clubs in Jakarta
Association football clubs established in 1997
1997 establishments in Indonesia